Ion Moldovan (born 3 September 1954) is a retired Romanian footballer. He is nicknamed "Comisarul".

Honours

Player
Dinamo București
Divizia A: 1976–77
Victoria București
Divizia B: 1984–85

Coach
Olimpia Râmnicu Sărat
Divizia C: 1988–89
Oțelul Galați
Divizia B: 1990–91
Argeş Piteşti
Divizia B: 1993–94
Al-Muharraq
Bahraini Premier League: 1998–99
Al-Ittihad Tripoli
Libyan Premier League: 2005–06
Libyan SuperCup: 2005, 2006

References

External links
 
 
 Ion Moldovan Interview at Sportm.ro 

1954 births
Living people
Sportspeople from Constanța
Romanian footballers
FCV Farul Constanța players
FC Dinamo București players
CSM Flacăra Moreni players
Romania youth international footballers
Romanian football managers
Romanian expatriate football managers
ASC Oțelul Galați managers
FC UTA Arad managers
FC Argeș Pitești managers
ASC Daco-Getica București managers
FC Dinamo București managers
Libya national football team managers
Expatriate football managers in Libya
FC Astra Giurgiu managers
CSM Ceahlăul Piatra Neamț managers
CS Mioveni managers
CS Concordia Chiajna managers
Association football midfielders
Al-Muharraq SC managers